Sialis is a genus of alderfly belonging to the order Megaloptera family Sialidae.

Description
These alderflies are small and mainly brown with a relatively heavy body and forewings reaching a  length of 10 to 20 millimeters. Females are usually larger than males. They have wings with large cells forming a network. The upper edge of the front wings consists of almost square cells. The species belonging to the genus Sialis have less than fifteen square cells, while the other Megaloptera have more cells. The adults are diurnal and fly from May to June on the riparian vegetation.

 Females lay on the leaves of the shore plants up to 2000 eggs in groups of about 200. The resulting hatching larvae fall directly into the water. They live in the water at first, and later buried in the mud, up to 18 meters of depth. These larvae feed on larvae of insects, worms and small molluscs. They usually need two years to develop, overwintering as larvae. Pupation takes place on the shore under the soil.

Distribution
Species of this genus are present in most of Europe.

List of species 
 Sialis abchasica (Vshivkova 1985)
 Sialis dorochovae (Vshivkova 1985)
 Sialis fuliginosa (Pictet 1836)
 Sialis gonzalezi (Vshivkova 1985)
 Sialis klingstedti (Vshivkova 1985)
 Sialis lutaria (Linnaeus 1758) 
 Sialis morio (Klingstedt 1932)
 Sialis nigripes (Pictet 1865)
 Sialis sibirica (McLachlan 1872)
 Sialis sordida (Klingstedt 1932)

References

 Ekkehard Wachmann, Christoph Saure: Netzflügler, Schlamm- und Kamelhalsfliegen, Naturbuch-Verlag, Augsburg 1997
 Wilfried Wichard: Schlammfliegen aus Baltischem Bernstein (Megaloptera, Sialidae). In Mitt. Geol.-Paläont. Inst. Univ. Hamburg. 80: S. 197-211, 2 Abb., 9. Taf., Hamburg 1997.

External links
 Biolib
 Fauna Europaea

Megaloptera
Insects of Europe